The Natchez Trace Trail is a designated National Scenic Trail in the United States, whose route generally follows sections of the  Natchez Trace Parkway through the states of Tennessee, Alabama, and Mississippi. Moreover, the Natchez Trace Trail, unlike many others that rely heavily on volunteers for trail construction and maintenance, is managed and maintained by the National Park Service. Sections of the trail follow along the Natchez Trace Parkway road shoulder, and cross county and state roads. It was originally intended to be longer and follow most of the Natchez Trace Parkway, but only portion was built. 

The Natchez Trace Parkway and National Scenic Trail commemorate the historic Natchez Trace, an ancient path that began as a wildlife and Native American trail, and has a rich history of use by colonizers, "Kaintuck" boatmen, post riders, and military men.

Sections 
This trail comprises five sections. The table below is ordered from South, Milepost 0 (Natchez) to North, Milepost 444 (near Nashville), but can be sorted differently.

References

External links
 National Park Service website
 Natchez Trace Compact

Hiking trails in Alabama
Hiking trails in Mississippi
Hiking trails in Tennessee
Long-distance trails in the United States
Natchez Trace
National Scenic Trails of the United States
National Park Service areas in Alabama
National Park Service areas in Mississippi
National Park Service areas in Tennessee
Protected areas of Claiborne County, Mississippi
Protected areas of Lee County, Mississippi
Protected areas of Madison County, Mississippi
Protected areas of Williamson County, Tennessee
Protected areas established in 1983
1983 establishments in Alabama
1983 establishments in Mississippi
1983 establishments in Tennessee